Black Peak is a peak of the Šar Mountains located in Kosovo and the Republic of North Macedonia. Black Peak stands at 2,536m above sea level. The famous Brezovica ski resort is situated close to the peak.

Notes and references

References:

Mountains of Kosovo
Šar Mountains
Two-thousanders of Kosovo
Mountains of North Macedonia